This is a list of all Ukrainian oblasts and territories, in order of descending population (in 2012). Note that since the War in Donbas started in the spring of 2014, 1,5 million people from Donetsk Oblast and Luhansk Oblast have either fled to Russia or to other parts of Ukraine. Since March 2014 Crimea and Sevastopol have been disputed between Russia and Ukraine, with Russia signing a treaty of accession on 18 March 2014 with the self-declared independent Republic of Crimea, absorbing it into the Russian Federation, though this is not recognised by Ukraine or most of the international community.

Population as of November 1st 2015

References

See also

Population
Ukrainian oblasts and territories